Lindberg is a municipality in the district of Regen in Bavaria in Germany in the immediate neighbourhood of the larger town Zwiesel.

Location 
Lindberg lies in the Danube Forest (Donau-Wald) region in the middle 
of the Bavarian Forest on the Glasstraße at the foot of the 1,315-metre-high Falkenstein only four kilometres from Zwiesel and 14 km northeast of the county town of Regen, 30 km northwest of Grafenau and 14 km from the border at Bayerisch Eisenstein.

Sights 
 Höllbachgspreng

References

Regen (district)